Otonycteris is a genus of vesper bats. Members of this genus are found in Northern Africa and Central Asia. Until recently, it was thought to be monotypic, but in 2010, the Turkestani long-eared bat was distinguished from the desert long-eared bat; previously, all populations were recognized as the desert long-eared bat.

Currently, it consists of two species:
Desert long-eared bat (Otonycteris hemprichii)
Subspecies
Otonycteris hemprichii hemprichii: found in North Africa, the Levant, and the Middle East
Otonycteris hemprichii cinerea: found in the mountains of Iran and Oman
Otonycteris hemprichii jin:  found in low-elevation deserts of the eastern Arabian Peninsula and southeast Iran
Turkestani long-eared bat (Otonycteris leucophaea)

References

 
Taxa named by Wilhelm Peters
Bat genera